Orenaia is a genus of moths of the family Crambidae.

Species
Orenaia alpestralis (Fabricius, 1787)
Orenaia alticolalis (Barnes & McDunnough, 1914)
Orenaia andereggialis (Herrich-Schäffer, 1851)
Orenaia arcticalis Munroe, 1974
Orenaia coloradalis Barnes & McDunnough, 1914
Orenaia helveticalis (Herrich-Schäffer, 1851)
Orenaia lugubralis (Lederer, 1857)
Orenaia macneilli Munroe, 1974
Orenaia pallidivittalis Munroe, 1956
Orenaia sierralis Munroe, 1974
Orenaia trivialis Barnes & McDunnough, 1914

References

Natural History Museum Lepidoptera genus database

Evergestinae